Saqajaa {Inuktitut syllabics: ᓴᖃᔮ) formerly Sakkiak Island is one of the uninhabited Canadian arctic islands located in Hudson Strait, Nunavut, Canada. It is a Baffin Island offshore island in the Qikiqtaaluk Region, separated by deep water from Cape Dorset ,  to the south-southwest.

References

Islands of Baffin Island
Islands of Hudson Strait
Uninhabited islands of Qikiqtaaluk Region